Gapsville is an unincorporated community in East Providence Township, Bedford County, Pennsylvania, United States, south of Breezewood.

Geography
Gapsville is located on South Breezewood Road (State Route 2024). Just to the east, across the county line in Fulton County, is Crystal Spring.

The community lies west of a water gap, where Brush Creek passes through Rays Hill, which forms the eastern border of Bedford County.

Notable features
The Breezewood Post of the VFW is located in the town, as is the Brush Creek Campground.

References

Unincorporated communities in Bedford County, Pennsylvania
Unincorporated communities in Pennsylvania
Water gaps of Pennsylvania